Kirtsaeng v. John Wiley & Sons, Inc., 568 U.S. 519 (2013), is a United States Supreme Court copyright decision in which the Court held, 6–3, that the first-sale doctrine applies to copies of copyrighted works lawfully made abroad.

Background
In 2008, John Wiley & Sons, Inc. filed suit against Thailand native Supap Kirtsaeng over the sale of foreign edition textbooks made outside of the United States marked for sale exclusively abroad which Kirtsaeng imported into the United States. When Kirtsaeng came to America in 1997 to study at Cornell University, he discovered that Wiley textbooks were considerably more expensive to buy in the United States than in his home country. Kirtsaeng asked his relatives from Thailand to buy such books at home and ship them to him to sell at a profit. He sold the imported books on eBay, making $1.2 million in revenue, although the parties disputed the net profit amount.

Wiley sued Kirtsaeng for copyright infringement and won in two lower courts. The Second Circuit Court of Appeals upheld the ban on importation of copyrighted works without the authority of the U.S. copyright owner; this set up a Circuit split with the Third Circuit and the Ninth Circuit, which had had variant approaches to the same question in other cases.

Kirtsaeng then appealed to the Supreme Court, which granted the writ of certiorari on April 16, 2012. Oral argument was held October 29, and judgment was issued March 19, 2013.

Decision

In 2013, the U.S. Supreme Court reversed the Second Circuit and held that Kirtsaeng's sale of lawfully-made copies purchased overseas was protected by the first-sale doctrine. The Court held that the first sale doctrine applies to goods manufactured outside of the United States, and the protections and exceptions offered by the Copyright Act to works "lawfully made under this title" is not limited by geography. Rather, it applies to all copies legally made anywhere, not just in the United States, in accordance with U.S. copyright law. So, wherever a copy of a book is first made and sold, it can be resold in the U.S. without permission from the publisher.

Justice Stephen Breyer wrote the opinion of the court which, was joined by five Justices (Roberts, Thomas, Alito, Sotomayor, and Kagan). Justice Elena Kagan also wrote a separate concurring opinion, signed by Samuel Alito. Justice Ruth Bader Ginsburg dissented, joined by Anthony Kennedy and Antonin Scalia. Kagan's concurrence suggested that Congress could change the law to reverse the decision.

Reactions
In law, Kirtsaeng has had the effect of causing a fresh look at the issue of "international exhaustion" in the patent context. The Federal Circuit in the 2001 Jazz Photo v. US International Trade Commission case had held that lawful sales of patented goods outside the US did not give rise to patent exhaustion inside the U.S. In a 2015 order in Lexmark v. Impression Products, the Federal Circuit sua sponte (unprompted) called for briefing and amicus curiae participation in an en banc consideration of whether:

In light of Kirtsaeng v. John Wiley & Sons, Inc., 133 S. Ct. 1351 (2012), should this court overrule Jazz Photo Corp. v. International Trade Commission, 264 F.3d 1094 (Fed. Cir. 2001), to the extent it ruled that a sale of a patented item outside the United States never gives rise to United States patent exhaustion.

Similarly, an effort by academic publisher Pearson to control after-market textbook sales on the basis of trademark was dismissed, citing Kirtsaeng.

In educational publishing, Wiley, the Kirtsaeng plaintiff that lost the case, increased its prices for the international editions as well as the international student editions and cited Kirtsaeng.

The decision also had an outcome-determinative effect on the long-pending dispute between Omega watches (a division of Swatch) and the retailer Costco. Whereas Omega had initially prevailed in the Ninth Circuit, the same way that John Wiley had, the decision was reversed after the United States Supreme Court decided Kirtsaeng.

See also 
 Grey market
 Quality King v. L'anza, 523 U.S. 135 (1998) – same result, but for goods that were made in the U.S., exported, then re-imported
 Parallel import

References

External links
 
 SCOTUS blog coverage of the decision (filings, briefs, decisions, etc.)
 Knowledge Ecology International (KEI), Analysis of the decision

2013 in United States case law
United States copyright case law
United States Supreme Court cases
United States Supreme Court cases of the Roberts Court